Hamish Turnbull (born 1999) is a British track cyclist.

Cycling career
Turnbull became British champion when winning the Sprint Championship at the 2020 British National Track Championships. He had finished third in 2019. At the 2022 British National Track Championships in Newport, Wales he won another British title after winning the team sprint. He also won two bronze medals at the same Championships. He competed at the 2022 Commonwealth Games in the sprint event.

Turnbull won his third national title at the 2023 British Cycling National Track Championships, he won the Keirin for the first time.

References

1999 births
Living people
British male cyclists
British track cyclists
Sportspeople from Northumberland
Cyclists at the 2022 Commonwealth Games
Commonwealth Games competitors for England
21st-century British people
Commonwealth Games silver medallists for England
Commonwealth Games medallists in cycling
Medallists at the 2022 Commonwealth Games